Ev'ry Day of My Life was Bobby Vinton's twenty-second studio album, released in 1972. The title track and "I'll Make You My Baby" were album's two singles, the latter of which failed to make the Billboard Hot 100. Cover versions include "Misty Blue", "I Won't Cry Anymore", "Just a Little Lovin' (Early in the Mornin')", "I'll Make You My Baby" (a different version of Barbara Lewis' hit "Make Me Your Baby") and "And I Love You So".

Track listing

Album credits
"Ev'ry Day of My Life" and "You Can Do It to Me Anytime" produced by Jimmy Bowen
"Let's Sing a Song", "Just a Little Lovin' (Early in the Mornin')", "She Loves Me", "And I Love You So" and "Whose Garden Was This" produced by Jimmy Wisner with Jim "JR" Reeves
"Misty Blue", "I Won't Cry Anymore" and "I'll Make You My Baby" produced by Billy Sherrill
"I'm Comin' Home, Girl" produced by Snuff Garrett
Background vocalists for "Misty Blue": the Nashville Sounds
Background vocalists for "I Won't Cry Anymore": the Nashville Edition
Engineering: Phil Macy, Charlie Bragg and Lou Bradley
Recording engineer: Jim Reeves
Mixing: Jim Reeves
Sound supervision: Warren Vincent
Front cover photo: Ivan Nagy
Back cover photo: Wolf Wregin, Las Vegas News Bureau

Charts
Album - Billboard (United States)

Singles - Billboard (United States)

References

1972 albums
Bobby Vinton albums
Albums produced by Billy Sherrill
Albums produced by Jimmy Bowen
Albums produced by Snuff Garrett
Epic Records albums